Mariano Andrés Herrón Valera (born 24 February 1978 in Buenos Aires) is a retired Argentine footballer. He is currently the assistant coach of Boca Juniors.

Career
Herrón began his playing career with Argentinos Juniors on 10 August 1998 in a 2-2 draw with Gimnasia y Esgrima de Jujuy. In 2000, he had a loan spell with French side Montpellier but returned to play for Argentinos until 2002.

After single seasons with San Lorenzo and Rosario Central he joined Spanish side UE Lleida in 2004. In 2005, he returned again to Argentina to play for Independiente. He spent the whole of 2009 on loan to Deportivo Cali of Colombia.

In July 2010, Herrón moved to the second division to play for Aldosivi.

Coaching career
After retiring, Herrón became a part of Bichi Borghi's coaching staff at Argentinos Juniors. On 18 December 2017, Herrón was appointed as the assistant coach of Cristian Raúl Ledesma at Club Atlético Tigre. He left on 11 February 2019 alongside manager Mariano Echeverría.

In January 2020, he was appointed assistant coach to his former coach Miguel Ángel Russo at Boca Juniors.

References

External links
 Argentine Primera statistics  
 
 

1978 births
Living people
Argentine footballers
Argentinos Juniors footballers
San Lorenzo de Almagro footballers
Rosario Central footballers
Montpellier HSC players
Club Atlético Independiente footballers
UE Lleida players
Deportivo Cali footballers
Expatriate footballers in Colombia
Expatriate footballers in France
Expatriate footballers in Spain
Argentine expatriate footballers
Aldosivi footballers
Ligue 1 players
Argentine Primera División players
Categoría Primera A players
Argentine expatriate sportspeople in Colombia
Argentine expatriate sportspeople in France
Argentine expatriate sportspeople in Spain
Footballers from Buenos Aires
Association football midfielders